Umpqua Holdings Corporation, d.b.a. Umpqua Bank, is a financial holding company based in downtown Portland, Oregon, United States. Headquarters are in the Umpqua Bank Plaza, formerly the headquarters of Benj. Franklin Savings and Loan. The firm has two principal operating subsidiaries: Umpqua Bank (the Bank) and Umpqua Investments (formerly Strand, Atkinson, Williams and York (Investments)).

The company’s main operating segments are personal banking and lending, business banking and lending, and wealth management. The bank serves consumers and businesses in the community.
As of 2015, Umpqua Bank had $24 billion in assets and $18 billion in deposits and was ranked among the largest 60 banks in the nation. Its parent company, Umpqua Holdings, is publicly traded. As of 2016, Umpqua Bank was the largest Oregon-based bank and had 350 branches in Oregon, Washington, California, Nevada and Idaho.

In October 2021, Umpqua announced it was merging with Tacoma-based Columbia Bank. Columbia Bank branches would transition to the Umpqua name and branding. The combined company would be based in Tacoma, with the bank operational headquarters based in the Portland area.

History

South Umpqua State Bank was formed in 1953, in Canyonville, Oregon, with six employees. It was started by a group of people working in the timber business who wanted to create a means for the employees to cash their payroll checks.  The bank opened with capital of $50,000 and surplus and reserves of $25,000. The bank’s first savings account was opened by Pete Duchene, a local business agent. D.B. “Tex” Ritter and his wife Nadine opened the first commercial account for their South Umpqua Trucking Company.

In 2002, Umpqua increased its number of branches to 63 by acquiring Centennial Bancorp of Eugene, Oregon, for $214 million.  On January 16, 2009, Umpqua agreed to assume the deposits of Vancouver, Washington-based Bank of Clark County after the latter bank was seized by the Office of the Comptroller of the Currency. Umpqua agreed to assume the deposits of Seattle, Washington-based Evergreen Bank in January 2010 after the latter was closed by the Washington Department of Financial Institutions and the Federal Deposit Insurance Corporation (FDIC) was appointed receiver. A month later the company agreed to take over the deposits of Tacoma, Washington-based Rainier Pacific Bank after it was seized by the FDIC. The next month, Umpqua acquired the banking operations of Rainier Pacific Bank in a purchase agreement with the Federal Deposit Insurance Corporation.

Umpqua continued with acquisitions in 2012 when they attempted to buy California-based American Perspective Bank for $44.7 million, which would have added two branches to Umpqua's then 196 branches. The deal fell through, however, when Umpqua was outbid; American Perspective paid Umpqua a $1.6 million fee to terminate the deal. Umpqua had been expanding into the San Francisco Bay Area and closed a $24.9 million deal to buy Bay Area-based Circle Bancorp in November 2012.

In September 2013, Umpqua announced it would buy Sterling Financial Corporation, parent of Sterling Bank, the second largest bank in Washington. The $2 billion deal closed in April 2014 and increased the number of bank branches to 394 and increased assets to $22 billion.

Former CEO and President of Umpqua Holdings Corporation Raymond Davis took over the local 40-person South Umpqua Bank in 1994. Davis became CEO and President of Umpqua Holdings in 1999. In 2007, Davis authored a book titled Leading for Growth: How Umpqua Bank Got Cool and Created a Culture of Greatness.
Cort O’Haver became President in April 2016, with Davis retaining the role of CEO. Davis stepped down as CEO in January 2017. O’Haver took over as CEO at that point while Davis became executive chair of the bank's board and continued to oversee Pivotus Ventures Inc. until his formal retirement, which was announced In late December 2017 and effective January 2, 2018.

See also
 List of companies based in Oregon

References

External links

Companies based in Portland, Oregon
American companies established in 1953
Banks established in 1953
Banks based in Oregon
Companies formerly listed on the Nasdaq
1953 establishments in Oregon
2023 mergers and acquisitions